Noyal (Gallo: Nóyau) is a commune in the Côtes-d'Armor department of Brittany in northwestern France.

Population

The inhabitants of Noyal are known in French as noyalais.

See also
Communes of the Côtes-d'Armor department

References

Communes of Côtes-d'Armor